The 2004 Vorarlberg state election was held on 19 September 2004 to elect the members of the Landtag of Vorarlberg in Austria.

The Austrian People's Party (ÖVP) regained the absolute majority it had lost in 1999, achieving a strong swing of 9 percentage points. The Freedom Party of Austria (FPÖ) lost more than half its vote share and seats, falling to third place behind the Social Democratic Party of Austria (SPÖ), which gained four points. The Greens also gained four points and doubled their seat count from two to four.

The repeal of compulsory voting resulted in a huge decline in voter turnout, which fell from 87% to 60%. As a result, only the Greens actually gained votes compared to 1999; the ÖVP lost 7,000 votes, the SPÖ 200, and the FPÖ 33,000. According to voter analysis conducted by the SORA Institute, only 28% of the FPÖ's voters from 1999 voted for the party again in 2004, while more than half did not vote at all.

Background
In the 1999 election, the ÖVP lost its absolute majority for the first time in history. The FPÖ achieved its best ever result, taking support from the ÖVP and SPÖ. The ÖVP subsequently formed a coalition with the FPÖ.

Electoral system
The 36 seats of the Landtag of Vorarlberg are elected via open list proportional representation in a two-step process. The seats are distributed between four multi-member constituencies, corresponding to the districts of Vorarlberg. For parties to receive any representation in the Landtag, they must either win at least one seat in a constituency directly, or clear a 5 percent state-wide electoral threshold. Seats are distributed in constituencies according to the Hagenbach-Bischoff quota, with any remaining seats allocated at the state level, to ensure overall proportionality between a party's vote share and its share of seats.

Contesting parties
The table below lists parties represented in the previous Landtag.

In addition to the parties already represented in the Landtag, four parties collected enough signatures to be placed on the ballot.

 VAU – www.vau-heute.at (VAU)
 List of Free Citizens (LFB)
 List for all Dissatisfied and Self-thinking (FRIZZ)
 DBK – The Buntkarierten (DBK) – on the ballot only in Bludenz, Dornbirn, and Feldkirch

Result

Results by constituency

References

Vorarlberg state election
State elections in Austria
Vorarlberg state election